The 1999 International Formula 3000 season was the thirty-third season of the second-tier of Formula One feeder championship and also fifteenth season under the International Formula 3000 Championship moniker which was an FIA sanctioned motor racing title for drivers of Formula 3000 racing cars. The title was contested over a ten-round series from 1 May to 25 September 1999. This was the first F3000 season in which every International Championship race took place during a Formula One weekend and supported the Grand Prix itself.

21 teams entered the championship. For 2000, the FIA imposed an upper limit of 15 teams of 2 cars each, with one of the places reserved for the winning team of the 1999 Italian Formula 3000 Championship; therefore, 7 bottom-ranked teams would not have been eligible to advance to the next year, which increased the competition. Portman-Arrows team collapsed midway through the championship, and Arden's Marc Goossens was disqualified in Hungary due to illegal changes in suspension, which denied Arden its first and the only points in the championship, causing a controversy.

Drivers and teams 

The following drivers and teams took part in the 1999 FIA Formula 3000 International Championship. A Lola B99/50 chassis powered by a Zytek V8 engine was mandatory for all entries.

Calendar
Starting in 1999, all International Formula 3000 were held on Formula One Grand Prix courses.

Final points standings

Drivers' Championship

Notes
All drivers used Lola B99/50 chassis, with Zytek V8 engines, and Avon tyres.
Marc Goossens was disqualified from the Hungarian round of the championship due to an illegal suspension damper.

Complete Overview

R=retired NC=not classified NS=did not start NQ=did not qualify NT=no time set in qualifying DIS(3)=disqualified after finishing in third place DIS=disqualified in practice

See also
 1999 Italian Formula 3000 season

References

Further reading
 Heidfeld's Year, Formula 3000 Review, Autocourse, 1999/2000, pages 238-241
 Other Major Results, Autocourse, 1999/2000, pages 281-282
 Automobile Year, 1999/2000 (championship points table), page 258

External links
 Unofficial F3000 Information - 1999
 1999 Formula 3000 International Championship - Race results
 1999 F3000 image gallery

Formula 3000
International Formula 3000 seasons
Formula 3000